In enzymology, a formate dehydrogenase (NADP+) is an enzyme that catalyzes the chemical reaction

formate + NADP+  CO2 + NADPH

Thus, the two substrates of this enzyme are formate and NADP+, whereas its two products are CO2 and NADPH.

This enzyme belongs to the family of oxidoreductases, specifically those acting on the aldehyde or oxo group of donor with NAD+ or NADP+ as acceptor.  The systematic name of this enzyme class is formate:NADP+ oxidoreductase. Other names in common use include NADP+-dependent formate dehydrogenase, and formate dehydrogenase (NADP+).  This enzyme participates in methane metabolism.  It has 3 cofactors: iron, Tungsten,  and Selenium.

Structural studies

As of late 2007, only one structure has been solved for this class of enzymes, with the PDB accession code .

References

 
 

EC 1.17.1
NADPH-dependent enzymes
Iron enzymes
Tungsten enzymes
Enzymes of known structure